Risen is the debut album by South African gothic rock band The Awakening released in April 1997. The record contains the hit single "The Sounds of Silence," an adaptation of the song by Simon and Garfunkel. The cover achieved massive popularity throughout South Africa and remains one of the band's most renowned singles.

Recording history
Production for Risen began in March 1996. The album was recorded at Mega Music Studios in Johannesburg with producer Leon Erasmus.

Track listing
All songs written by Ashton Nyte except where noted.
"Nightfall" – 0:34
"Past Idol" – 4:00
"Change" – 4:05
"Focus" – 3:30
"The Sounds of Silence" (Paul Simon) – 3:53
"Difference" – 4:28
"Intervention" – 3:55
"Holocaust" – 5:09
"Standing" – 4:14
"Turn Away" – 3:20
"Jezzebel" – 4:30
"Sacrificial" – 4:33
"Child of the Moon" – 2:16Bonus tracks on United States re-release:
"Standing (acoustic version)" - 3:42
"No Reason" - 4:21

Lineup
 Ashton Nyte: Vocals and instruments
 Jenni Hazell: Bass guitar on Tracks 1-4,6,8-12
 Philip Booysens: Guitar solo on track 3, lead guitar on track 12
 Leon Erasmus: Keyboards on tracks 3,4,7,9
 Cheryl Staples: Backing vocals on tracks 9,11

References

The Awakening (band) albums
1997 debut albums